Royal Air Force Great Orton or more simply RAF Great Orton is a former Royal Air Force satellite station located west of Great Orton, Cumbria and the City of Carlisle, Cumbria, England.

History

The following units were here at some point:
 No. 1 (Coastal) Engine Control Demonstration Unit RAF
 No. 3 Tactical Exercise Unit RAF
 No. 4 Tactical Exercise Unit RAF
 No. 6 Operational Training Unit RAF
 No. 55 OTU
 No. 60 Maintenance Unit RAF
 No. 219 Maintenance Unit RAF
 No. 249 Maintenance Unit RAF
 A detachment of No. 281 Squadron RAF with the Vickers Warwick I (1944–45)
 A detachment of No. 282 Squadron RAF with the Warwick I (1944–45)

Current use

The site is currently an nature reserve.

References

Citations

Bibliography

Great Orton